Baron Ebury, of Ebury Manor in the County of Middlesex, is a title in the Peerage of the United Kingdom that dates from 1857. In 1999, it became a subsidiary title of the earldom of Wilton after the 6th Baron Ebury inherited the earldom from his distant cousin, the 7th Earl of Wilton.

History
The peerage was created in September 1857 for the Whig politician Lord Robert Grosvenor. He was the third son of Robert Grosvenor, 1st Marquess of Westminster, and his wife Lady Eleanor Egerton, daughter of Thomas Egerton, 1st Earl of Wilton.

Both Lord Robert and his elder brother Lord Thomas were in special remainder to the viscountcy of Grey de Wilton and the earldom of Wilton, created for their maternal grandfather in 1801. Upon the latter's death in 1814, Lord Thomas succeeded as second Earl of Wilton.

Lord Ebury was succeeded by his eldest son, the second Baron. He represented Westminster in Parliament as a Liberal. His grandson, the fifth Baron, served as a government whip from 1939 to 1940 in the government of Neville Chamberlain. In 1999, his eldest son, the sixth Baron, succeeded as eighth Earl of Wilton on the death of his kinsman, the seventh Earl.

The Honourable Norman Grosvenor, younger son of the first Baron, sat as Member of Parliament for Chester.

Barons Ebury (1857)
Robert Grosvenor, 1st Baron Ebury (1801–1893)
Robert Wellesley Grosvenor, 2nd Baron Ebury (1834–1918)
Robert Victor Grosvenor, 3rd Baron Ebury (1868–1921)
Francis Egerton Grosvenor, 4th Baron Ebury (1883–1932)
Robert Egerton Grosvenor, 5th Baron Ebury (1914–1957)
Francis Egerton Grosvenor, 8th Earl of Wilton, 6th Baron Ebury (b. 1934)
For further barons, see Earl of Wilton.

See also
Duke of Westminster
Baron Grey de Wilton
Baron Stalbridge

References

1857 establishments in the United Kingdom
Baronies in the Peerage of the United Kingdom
Noble titles created in 1857
Noble titles created for UK MPs